Clyde Wesley "Cac" Hubbard (September 13, 1896 – October 30, 1980) was an American football, basketball, and baseball coach and college athletics administrator.  Hubbard served as the head football coach at the College of Puget Sound—now known as the University of Puget Sound—from 1926 to 1928 and at the University of Denver from 1939 to 1941 and again from 1944 to 1947, compiling a career college football coaching record of 45–35–10.  Hubbard was the head basketball coach at Denver from 1932 to 1940 and the school's baseball coach in 1948.  He served as the athletic director at Denver from 1941 to 1948 and at the University of Montana from 1949 to 1952.

Hubbard graduated from Oregon State Agricultural College—now known as Oregon State University—in 1921.  There he lettered in football, basketball, and baseball.

Head coaching record

Football

References

External links
 

1896 births
1980 deaths
American football ends
American men's basketball players
Denver Pioneers athletic directors
Denver Pioneers baseball coaches
Denver Pioneers football coaches
Denver Pioneers men's basketball coaches
Montana Grizzlies and Lady Griz athletic directors
Oregon State Beavers baseball players
Oregon State Beavers football players
Oregon State Beavers men's basketball players
Puget Sound Loggers football coaches
People from Weiser, Idaho
Basketball coaches from Idaho